Ammochostos Stadium is a multi-purpose stadium in Larnaca, Cyprus. It is currently used mostly for football matches and is the temporary home ground of the refugee team from the occupied city of Famagusta, Nea Salamis Famagusta.

History 
The original home ground of Nea Salamina FC was GSE Stadium in Famagusta, but due to the Turkish occupation of the town since 1974 they cannot use it. After that, Nea Salamis FC moved, temporarily, to Larnaca and built their own stadium.

The decision to build the stadium came in 1989. The December of the same year it started to be built. After many wages offered from Salamis fans in Cyprus and abroad, from Cyprus Sports Association and from many workers it was built in a short time.

The first official game of Nea Salamina Famagusta in the stadium was played on 12 October 1991 with Evagoras Paphos as opponent. Nea Salamina won 4–1.

The stadium hosted the 1992 UEFA European Under-16 Football Championship final on 17 May 1992 between Germany and Spain where Germany won 2–1.

In 1998, the stadium underwent some renovations.

Ammochostos Stadium has a capacity of 5,000 seats and is located in Larnaca. Soon, a third shuttle will be built and the stadium will hold 7,500 people.

Since 2007, under the south shuttle of the stadium is the dwelling and the offices of Nea Salamis FC.

Name 
Ammochostos Stadium named after the town of Famagusta (Ammochostos), which is the original seat of Nea Salamina.

Other teams 
The stadium was used for some periods as a home ground by Alki Larnaca FC (2007—2009), AEL Limassol (in 2001, for a little period due to the improvement of their own ground), Ermis Aradippou (2001–2002, 2010–2012, 2013–14, 2020–), Doxa Katokopia (2012–2013) and Alki Oroklini (2016–present).

Gallery

References

Sources

External links

 (el) Official web site of the club

Athletics (track and field) venues in Cyprus
Football venues in Cyprus
Multi-purpose stadiums in Cyprus
Sports venues in Cyprus
Sport in Larnaca
Nea Salamis Famagusta FC
Buildings and structures in Larnaca